Emily Sarah Gaddum  (née Naylor; born 23 December 1985) is a former New Zealand field hockey player. One of the country's most experienced players, she was due to finish her career after her fourth Olympic appearance at the 2016 Summer Olympics in Rio de Janeiro, but her retirement due to pregnancy was announced when the 2016 Olympic squad was named.

Early life and family 
Gaddum was born in 1985 in Palmerston North, New Zealand and attended Palmerston North Intermediate Normal School, and then Palmerston North Girls' High School. She married Harry Gaddum in February 2016.

Hockey career

In 2007, after an outstanding Champions Challenge performance, she was voted Oceania Player of the Century by The ABCD Hockey Magazine. Naylor was also named New Zealand Hockey's Woman Player of the Year in 2009 and 2010.

She was part of the New Zealand team that lost to Great Britain in the bronze medal match at the 2012 Summer Olympics.  In April 2014, with 239 international caps, Naylor became the most-capped New Zealand women's hockey player, surpassing the record of Susie Muirhead.  She withdrew from the national team in 2015.

Gaddum returned for the tour of Argentina in February and March 2016. She was named in the New Zealand 2016 squad that prepared for the Rio Olympics. For the first time as Emily Gaddum—following her marriage—she was included in the squads for test matches against Canada and against multiple international sides in March and April 2016. Gadddum's retirement was announced with the naming of the final team for the Rio Olympics due to becoming pregnant with her first child. She played a total of 274 for the national team during her career.

International senior competitions
 2004 – Olympic Qualifying Tournament, Auckland
 2004 – Olympic Games, Athens
 2004 – Champions Trophy, Rosario
 2005 – Champions Challenge, Virginia Beach
 2006 – Commonwealth Games, Melbourne
 2006 – World Cup Qualifier, Rome
 2006 – Champions Trophy, Amstelveen
 2008 – Olympic Games, Beijing
 2012 – Olympic Games, London

Honours and awards
In the 2020 Queen's Birthday Honours, Gaddum was appointed a Member of the New Zealand Order of Merit, for services to hockey.

References

External links
 

1985 births
Living people
Sportspeople from Palmerston North
New Zealand female field hockey players
Olympic field hockey players of New Zealand
Field hockey players at the 2004 Summer Olympics
Field hockey players at the 2008 Summer Olympics
Field hockey players at the 2012 Summer Olympics
Field hockey players at the 2006 Commonwealth Games
Field hockey players at the 2010 Commonwealth Games
Field hockey players at the 2014 Commonwealth Games
Commonwealth Games silver medallists for New Zealand
Commonwealth Games bronze medallists for New Zealand
People educated at Palmerston North Girls' High School
Commonwealth Games medallists in field hockey
Members of the New Zealand Order of Merit
21st-century New Zealand women
Medallists at the 2010 Commonwealth Games
Medallists at the 2014 Commonwealth Games